The Cabinet of Zimbabwe is the executive body that forms the government of Zimbabwe together with the President of Zimbabwe. The Cabinet is composed of the President, the Vice-Presidents, and ministers appointed by the President. Until 1987, the Cabinet was chaired by the Prime Minister; it is now headed by the President.

On 30 November 2017, Emmerson Mnangagwa, who succeeded ousted President Robert Mugabe, formed a new cabinet. On 3 December 2017, Mnangagwa replaced two of his ministers amidst criticism by opposition parties. On 7 September 2018, President Mnangagwa appointed a new cabinet after winning 2018 presidential elections. The new 20-member cabinet, along with 13 deputy ministers and nine provincial ministers, was sworn in on 11 September 2018.

Four members of the Cabinet of Zimbabwe died in the first two weeks of January 2021 because of the COVID-19 pandemic in Zimbabwe.

Selection

The President appoints two vice Presidents, ministers, and deputy ministers; and may dismiss them. The President also assigns their powers and functions, including the administration of any Act of Parliament or of any Ministry or department, but the President may reserve to himself or herself the administration of an Act, Ministry or department. Ministers and Deputy Ministers are appointed from among Senators or Members of the National Assembly, but up to five, chosen for their professional skills and competence, may be appointed from outside Parliament.

Ministers and Deputy Ministers who are not Members of Parliament may sit and speak, but not vote, in the Senate or the National Assembly.

A member of the Cabinet is appointed by the President to be the leader of government business in the National Assembly.

First Mnangagwa Cabinet before the 2018 elections
It consisted of two vice presidents, appointed ministers of government, and provincial affairs ministers.

Second Mnangagwa Cabinet after the 2018 elections 
Emmerson Mnangagwa was elected President for the first time in his own right in elections held on 30 July 2018 (after previously finishing the term of Robert Mugabe in July 2018). The election result was disputed and challenged before the Zimbabwean Constitutional court. The court ruled in Mnangagwa's favor and he was sworn in on 26 August 2018.

On 31 August in accordance with the constitution, Mnangagwa appointed and swore in Constantine Chiwenga and Kembo Mohadi as first and second Vice President respectively. The 2013 Constitution provides that any presidential election within ten years after the first election (the first election being 2013 after the adoption of the 2013 Constitution) the two Vice Presidents are appointed and not elected with the president. From 2023 onward the President and the two vice presidents will be elected on the same ticket and in the same election as the President.

Constantino Guvheya Nyikadzino Dominic Chiwenga – Vice President
Kembo Mohadi – Vice President
Mthuli Ncube – Finance & Economic Development
Oppah Muchinguri-Kashiri – Defence & War Veterans
July Moyo – Local Government, Public Works, and National Housing
Fredrick Shava– Foreign Affairs and International Trade
Sekai Nzenza – Public Service and Social Welfare
Mangaliso Ndlovu – Industry and Commerce
Cain Mathema – Home Affairs and Cultural Heritage
Amon Murwira – Higher and Tertiary Education Science and Technology Development
Paul Mavima – Primary and Secondary Education
Perrance Shiri – Lands, Agriculture, Water, Climate and Rural Resettlement
Winston Chitando – Mines and Mining Development
Joram Gumbo – Energy and Power Development
Joel Matiza – Transport and Infrastructural Development
Monica Mutsvangwa – Information, Publicity and Broadcasting Services
Kazembe Kazembe – Information Communication Technology Courier Services
Priscah Mupfumira – Environment, Tourism and Hospitality Industry
Kirsty Coventry – Youth, Sport, Arts, and Recreation
Obadiah Moyo – Health and Child Care
Ziyambi Ziyambi – Justice Legal and Parliamentary Affairs
Sithembiso Nyoni – Women Affairs, Community, Small and Medium Enterprise Development

In making the announcement Mnangagwa stated his belief that he had chosen "the right team to head the ministries and is optimistic that they will deliver".

Reactions to the Second Mnangagwa Cabinet

Jonathan Moyo

Former Minister of Higher & Tertiary Education Jonathan Moyo reacted on Twitter saying "THREE LOSERS standout from Mnangagwa's newly appointed Cabinet:

1. DEVOLUTION has lost out; appointment of 10 provincial ministers violates s268 of the Constitution.

2. CHIWENGA sidelined; with his picks left out.

3. TRIBAL BALANCE compromised; as Mnangagwa's cronies dominate!"

Jonathan Moyo also offered advice to the newly appointed Minister of Finance, Professor Mthuli Ncube warning him that as an outsider he will find it difficult to implement policies, and that "the Ministry of Finance does not have the high-end skills necessary for an economic ministry in a country with Zimbabwe's intractable socioeconomic problems; compounded by political malaise. There's no craft-competence from the permanent secretary, down to the shop floor".

 Health Minister Moyo's credentials

On the online publication, ZimLive.com journalist Lindie Whiz wrote an article in which she says "Zimbabwe's new Health Minister, Obadiah Moyo, is an academic fraud who does not have the qualification he claims to possess, according to the United States embassy." A medical doctor is quoted by the article casting doubt on Moyo's qualifications

Moyo claims to be a pathologist but is not listed in the Medical and Dental Practitioners Council of Zimbabwe registry and has not practiced as such in Zimbabwe.

Current Cabinet 
Since President Mnangagwa reshuffled his cabinet on 8 November 2019, the current cabinet of Zimbabwe is as follows:

References

External website

Government of Zimbabwe
Zimbabwe